Kirillovo (see Kirill) may refer to:

 Kirillovo, Republic of Bashkortostan, Russia, a village
 Kirillovo, Sakhalin Oblast - see Political divisions of Karafuto Prefecture
 Kirillovo, Vologda Oblast, Russia, a village